Euryxanthops flexidentatus is a species of crab.

References

Xanthoidea
Crustaceans described in 1983